Proszynellus occidentalis is a jumping spider species in the genus Proszynellus. The male was first identified in 2015 by Barbara Maria Patoleta and Marek Michał Żabka.

Distribution
Proszynellus occidentalis is found in Western Australia.

References

Spiders of Australia
Salticidae
Spiders described in 2015